Howard Davis Eberhart (August 16, 1906 – July 18, 1993) was an American engineer noted for his design of artificial limbs and other prosthetic devices.

Professor Eberhart was chairman of the Department of Civil Engineering at University of California, Berkeley and a member of the National Academy of Engineering.
The University of California called Eberhart "one of UC Berkeley's most highly respected and acclaimed teachers in civil engineering, and a pioneer of research in artificial limbs".
In 1977 Howard was elected to the National Academy of Engineering "for pioneering studies of human locomotion, application of structural engineering to prosthetic devices, and leadership of interdisciplinary engineering research."

Chronology 
 1906 born August 16 in Lima, Ohio
 1929:B.S. degree in architecture, the University of Oregon
 1935: M.S. degree in civil engineering, Oregon State College in Corvallis
 1936: instructor, the University of California, Berkeley
 1948: full professor of civil engineering, the University of California, Berkeley
 1959-1963 and 1971-1974: chairman of the Department of Civil Engineering, the University of California, Berkeley
 1974: retired from UC Berkeley

References 

1906 births
1993 deaths
Engineers from Ohio
Members of the United States National Academy of Engineering
People from Lima, Ohio
University of Oregon alumni
Oregon State University alumni
UC Berkeley College of Engineering faculty
20th-century American engineers